A palmoplantar hyperhidrosis is excessive sweating localized to the palms of the hands and soles of the feet. It is a form of focal hyperhidrosis in that the excessive sweating is limited to a specific region of the body. As with other types of focal hyperhidrosis (e.g. axillary and craniofacial) the sweating tends to worsen during warm weather.

See also
Hyperhidrosis

References

 

Conditions of the skin appendages